Claisebrook railway depot (also known as Claisebrook railcar depot) is a Transperth Trains depot adjacent to Claisebrook station, at 122 Kensington Street, East Perth. When trains leave this depot, they connect with the Midland, Fremantle, Armadale, and Joondalup lines.

In the 1940s, Claisebrook road depot referred to the then tramway depot adjoining the railway property in East Perth and much earlier in the 1860s the term Claisebrook depot referred to the convict depot.

Function
The railway depot's primary purpose is to service, refurbish and upgrade Transperth's A-Series railcars. The newer B-series railcars may also be stabled at Claisebrook railway depot for work that cannot be done at Mandurah or Nowergup at any time and for events such as the Australian Football League games on weekends at Perth Stadium and also for the Airport trains on the Airport Line. The depot has also recently started serving as the facility to maintain and refurbish the diesel-electric Transwa Australind railcars.

Facilities
Claisebrook railway depot has facilities to store, maintain and clean a large fleet of railcars.

References

Railway workshops in Western Australia
East Perth, Western Australia